Yellandu is a town in Bhadradri Kothagudem district of the Indian state of Telangana. It is located in Yellandu mandal of Kothagudem revenue division.

Geography 

It has an average elevation of 205 metres (672 feet). Bhuga vagu divides Yellandu which is started from Yellandula padu cheruvu. one of the important coal seams bore his name. The Hyderabad (Deccan) Company Limited incorporated in England acquired mining rights in 1886 to exploit coal found in Yellandu area. The present Company was incorporated on 23 December 1920 under the Hyderabad Companies Act as a public limited company with the name 'The Singareni Collieries Company Limited' (SCCL). It acquired all the assets and liabilities of the Hyderabad (Deccan) Co. Ltd. Best & Co., acted as Secretaries and Selling Agents. The State of Hyderabad purchased majority shares of the Company in 1945. From 1945 to 1949, the Hyderabad Construction Co., Ltd., was acting as Managing Agent. In 1949 this function was entrusted to Industrial Trust Fund by the then Government of Hyderabad. The controlling interest of the Company devolved on the Government of Andhra Pradesh in 1956 pursuant to the reorganization of States.

Nearest Cities 
Khammam=48 km
Warangal-106 km
Suryapet-110 km 
Hyderabad-246 km.

Yellandu BusTimings 
From yellandu to Khammam last bus 10:00 pm
From yellandu to Kothagudam last bus 09:00 pm
From yellandu to Mahabubabad last bus 8:15 pm 
more bustimings

Demographics 

 census of India, Yellandu municipality had a population of 33,732. While, its urban agglomeration had a population of 35,056, of which males are 17,016 and females are 18,040. The population under 6 years of age are 3,184. There are a total of 25,192 literates.

Government and politics 

Civic administration

Yellandu Municipality was constituted in 1986 and is classified as a third grade municipality with 24 election wards. Rompaid and Sudimalla are the partial outgrowths to the town as per 2011 census.

Politics

Yellandu is a part of Yellandu (ST) (Assembly constituency) for Telangana Legislative Assembly. Banoth Haripriya is the present MLA of the constituency from Telangana Rashtra Samithi. It is also a part of Mahabubabad (Lok Sabha constituency) which was won by Kavitha Maloth of Telangana Rashtra Samithi.

Economy 

Coal mining.

Yellandu is birthplace of the Singareni Collieries Company Limited, a coal mining company which is also referred as Boggutta in the regional language.

References 

Articles containing potentially dated statements from 2001
All articles containing potentially dated statements
Cities and towns in Bhadradri Kothagudem district